Robert Sobel (February 19, 1931 – June 2, 1999) was an American professor of history at Hofstra University and a well-known and prolific writer of business histories.

Biography 
Sobel was born in the Bronx, in New York City, New York. He completed his B.S.S. (1951) and M.A. (1952) at City College of New York, and after serving in the U.S. Army, obtained a Ph.D. from New York University in 1957. He started teaching at Hofstra in 1956. Sobel eventually became Lawrence Stessin Distinguished Professor of Business History at Hofstra. After his death, the university established the Robert Sobel Endowed Scholarship for Excellence in Business History & Finance.

Books
Sobel's first business history, published in 1965, was The Big Board: A History of the New York Stock Market. It was the first history of the stock market written in over a generation. The book was met with favorable reviews and solid sales, and Sobel's writing career was launched. Several of his subsequent books were bestsellers.

Besides writing more than 30 books, Sobel authored many articles, book reviews, and scripts for television documentaries and mini-series. From 1972 to 1988, Sobel's weekly investment column, "Knowing the Street," was nationally syndicated through New York Newsday. He was also regularly published in national periodicals, including The New York Times and The Wall Street Journal. At the time of his death, Sobel was also a contributing editor to Barron's Magazine. He was a regular guest on financial and other news shows, such as Wall Street Week and Crossfire.

Sobel was nearly as famous for his only work of fiction, the 1973 book, For Want of a Nail. This book is an alternate history in which Burgoyne won the Battle of Saratoga during the American Revolutionary War. This work detailed the history of an alternate timeline, complete with footnotes. Sobel had authored or co-authored several actual textbooks. For Want of a Nail was republished in 1997 and won a special achievement Sidewise Award for Alternate History that year.

Wall Street
Sobel's dominant passion was Wall Street, a fascination that he held since his childhood. "It is as though you are walking through a historical theme park, with this engaging man at your side pointing out the sights," said Andrew Tobias, the author and investment guide, in a review in The New York Times of The Last Bull Market: Wall Street in the 1960s (W. W. Norton, 1978).

Most of Sobel's books were written for a general audience, but he never bristled when some scholarly writers dismissed him as a "popularizer," said his colleague and friend George David Smith, a professor of economic history at New York University. "Quite the contrary—he saw that as his mission in life."

Selected quotations
From Panic on Wall Street by Robert Sobel:

From a February 22, 1999 Barron's Magazine article by Robert Sobel:

From The Great Bull Market: Wall Street in the 1920s, by Robert Sobel:

Selected bibliography

Fiction

Non-fiction

 *** A paperback reprint of IBM: Colossus in Transition.

References
 Hand, Judson, "If Washington Hadn't Been the Father of His Country," Sunday (New York Daily) News, February 18, 1973.
 Henriques, Diana B., "Robert Sobel, 68, a Historian of Business, Dies," New York Times, June 4, 1999, page C-18; 1999 WLNR 3054857.
 MacGregor, Martha,  "The Week in Books," New York Post, March 31, 1973.
 Sicilia, DB, "Remembering Robert Sobel (1931-1999)" Enterprise & Society: The International Journal of Business History, Vol. 1, Issue 1, pp. 182–187, (March 2000).
 Skow, John, "Parlor Games," Time, April 9, 1973.

External links
 "Robert Sobel, 68, a Historian of Business, Dies," New York Times, June 4, 1999.
Booknotes interview with Sobel on Coolidge: An America Enigma, August 30, 1998.
 

1931 births
1999 deaths
American finance and investment writers
New York University alumni
Sidewise Award winners
City College of New York alumni
Hofstra University faculty
20th-century American historians
American male non-fiction writers
20th-century novelists
Writers from the Bronx
Historians from New York (state)
Military personnel from New York City
20th-century American male writers